Hälleforsnäs railway station is the main train station of Hälleforsnäs, Sweden. It located between Eskilstuna and Flen on the Sala–Oxelösund line and is served by SJ Regional passenger trains traveling between Sala and Linköping, usually called UVEN.

References

Railway stations in Södermanland County